REX American Resources Corp. (REX) is an American producer and retailer of ethanol, distillers grains and natural gas as well as a holding company in energy entities. It was founded in 1980 and is headquartered in Dayton, Ohio. The company has the entire ownership of three affiliated corporations including Rex Radio and Television, Inc., Stereo Town, Inc. and Kelly & Cohen Appliances, Inc. As of 2012, the company has the ownership of 22 national retail stores and invested in five ethanol production entities nationwide. One of the plants the company invested in, One Earth Energy, LLC, has an annual capacity of 100 million gallons of ethanol and 320,000 tons of dried distillers grains. The company exited the retail industry and transferred to energy investment in 2009 with changing the name from Rex Stores Corporation to its current name in the following year.

Background
The company used to be engaged in retail industry, but it transferred its business focus to energy in 2009 and changed its name to REX American Resources Corporation one year later. The company operates its business in two segments including Alternative Energy and Real Estate. In Alternative Energy segment, the company's properties include One Earth Energy, NuGen Energy, Patriot Renewable Fuels, Levelland Hockley County Ethanol and a portfolio group. Among the properties, only Levelland Hockley County Ethanol stopped operation now. As for Real Estate segment, the company is engaged in leasing its retail stores (281,000 square feet) to customers. As of March 2014, the company has a market capitalization of $418.23 million with an enterprise value of $412.31 million.

References 

Energy companies of the United States
Companies based in Dayton, Ohio
Energy companies established in 1980
Renewable resource companies established in 1980
1980 establishments in Ohio
Companies listed on the New York Stock Exchange
American companies established in 1980